Juffair Mall is a shopping mall in the Juffair neighbourhood of Manama, the capital city of Bahrain.

The mall opened on 15 December 2015. A Lulu Hypermarket opened there on 6 January 2016, the 120th Lulu store in the world. The opening ceremony was patronised by Bahrain's Deputy Prime Minister, Shaikh Khalid bin Abdullah Al Khalifa.

Stores
LULU Hyper Market
Centerpoint
Golden Gallery For Fragrances
Mukta Cinemas

See also
List of shopping malls in Bahrain

References

External links

2015 establishments in Bahrain
Shopping malls established in 2015
Shopping malls in Manama